Ven a Mi Mundo is the third studio album released by Los Mismos on September 22, 1998.

Joel Solis departed from the band and was replaced by Rafael Valenzuela.

Track listing

References

1998 albums
Spanish-language albums
Los Mismos albums